Michael Cudlitz (born December 29, 1964) is an American actor known for portraying John Cooper in the NBC/TNT drama series Southland for which he won the Critics' Choice Television Award for Best Supporting Actor in a Drama Series in 2013, Sergeant Denver "Bull" Randleman in the HBO miniseries Band of Brothers, and Sergeant Abraham Ford in the AMC horror series The Walking Dead.

Early life 
He is a 1982 graduate of Lakewood High School. He holds a Bachelor of Fine Arts from the California Institute of the Arts, where he graduated in 1990.

Career 

While attending California Institute of the Arts, Cudlitz landed the role in Band of Brothers and worked in TV and film production in the art department of various shows. Cudlitz was a construction coordinator on Beverly Hills, 90210.

His first acting role was in the 1989 film Crystal Ball, playing Scottie. Other roles were Tony Miller on Beverly Hills, 90210 and Tad Overton on Dragon: The Bruce Lee Story, and in CSI: Crime Scene Investigation, the second seasons of 24, Lost, FOX series Standoff, and Prison Break.  He was also in the movie A River Runs Through It. He guest starred on Over There. He played Bob Destepello in the 1997 film Grosse Pointe Blank. He also played a 30-second role as a bartender in the movie Forces of Nature in 1999.

His breakout role came in 2001 with his portrayal of Sgt. Denver "Bull" Randleman in the World War II miniseries, Band of Brothers.  Cudlitz starred on the critically acclaimed, five-season television drama Southland as patrol officer John Cooper, a 20-year veteran and training officer. It was picked up by TNT, who aired the remaining episodes of its first season, bringing it back for a total of five seasons. The character struggled with chronic back pain, addiction to pain medication, and ethical issues relating to his partners. Prior to the start of shooting for the show, Cudlitz had a large mole removed from his right upper lip, which had previously been a signature feature of his appearance. The show was cancelled in 2013. Cudlitz won the Critics' Choice Television Award for Best Supporting Actor in a Drama Series for his role in 2013.

In 2009, Cudlitz appeared in the science fiction film Surrogates as Colonel Brendon. In 2013, Cudlitz played opposite Melanie Griffith in the movie, Dark Tourist.

From February 2014 to October 2016, he appeared in the AMC TV show The Walking Dead as Sergeant Abraham Ford, a character from the comic series of the same name. His first appearance was in the tenth episode of Season 4, an episode entitled "Inmates". Cudlitz's character was killed off in the premiere episode of the show's seventh season entitled "The Day Will Come When You Won't Be". Cudlitz quickly became a fan favorite, with fans noting his quirky and comedic sayings combined with his upfront approach.

Voice work 
Cudlitz voiced Sgt. Glenn "Hawk" Hawkins in the video game Call of Duty 2: Big Red One. He provided additional voice work for Call of Duty: Modern Warfare 2, Call of Duty: Modern Warfare 3 and Call of Duty 4: Modern Warfare.

Awards 
 2013: Critics Choice Awards, Best Supporting Actor in a Drama Series, Southland
 2013: Entertainment Industries Council PRISM Awards, Southland (episode: "Legacy")

Personal life 
Cudlitz is married to Rachel Cudlitz. They met while students at CalArts.

Filmography

Film

Television (miniseries, TV movies, shorts)

Television

Video games

Art department 
 1986–1988: Tales from the Darkside – carpenter (12 episodes)
 1988: The Unnamable – carpenter
 1989: W.B., Blue and the Bean – set construction
 1989: C.H.U.D. II: Bud the C.H.U.D. – carpenter
 1990–1993: Beverly Hills, 90210 – construction coordinator (65 episodes)
 1996: Dunston Checks In – propmaker gang boss
 1998: American History X – construction coordinator
 2007: Nobel Son – propmaker

References

External links 

 
 

1964 births
American male film actors
American male television actors
American male voice actors
Living people
People from Lakewood Township, New Jersey
People from Long Island
Male actors from New York (state)
California Institute of the Arts alumni
Male actors from New Jersey
20th-century American male actors
21st-century American male actors
Lakewood High School (New Jersey) alumni